This is a list of universities, colleges, polytechnics and other higher education in Indonesia.

According to the former Directorate General of Higher Education (now part of the Ministry of Research, Technology, & Higher Education), in 2018 there were 2,316 higher education institutions (2,235 private), including 391 universities (345 private). Higher education in Indonesia offers, academic degrees, vocational degrees, and professional degrees. They are provided by the following types of institutions:

 Community Academy provides vocational education for diploma one and/or diploma two programs in regencies/municipalities based on local excellence or to meet special needs.
 Academy, offers vocational education in a number of fields of common origin such as a military academy and nursing academy.
 Polytechnic, offers vocational education, and/or professional education in various fields
 Specialised College (Sekolah Tinggi), offers academic education and can provide vocational and/or professional education in 1 (one) specific cluster
 Institute, offers academic education and can provide vocational and/or professional education in a number of fields of common origin (technological cluster for example)
 University, offers academic education, and can provide vocational education, and/or professional education in various fields

Public higher education institutions
Public higher education institutions in Indonesia are funded by the Government, while governed as self-managed institutions. Currently, according to the 2020 Statistic report from Directorate General of Higher Education , there are 122 public higher education institutions divided into 63 public universities, 12 Institutes, 43 Polytechnics, and 4 Community Colleges.

Public universities

Public institutes

There are 12 Public Institutes in Indonesia: four Institutes of Technology, one Institute of Agriculture, four Institute of Arts (ISI), and three Institute of Cultural Arts (ISBI).

two more Institute of Cultural Arts are planned in Kalimantan Timur and Sulawesi Selatan. However, the Embrio of ISBI Kalimantan Timur in form of ISI Yogyakarta's PSDKU (Study Programs outside the Main Campus) faced problems in building its own campus. It  was facing problems so severe that the PSDKU Kalimantan Timur was suspended by the Ministry of Education and Culture. Meanwhile, the Embrio of ISBI Sulawesi Selatan in form of ISI Surakarta's PSDKU has no definite timeline in separating from ISI Surakarta.

Public polytechnics
Currently, there are 44 Public Polytechnics in Indonesia. They consist of one Electronic Engineering Polytechnic, two Manufacturing Polytechnics, one Maritime Polytechnic, one Fishery Polytechnic, one Shipbuilding Polytechnic, four Agricultural Polytechnics, and 34 "general" Polytechnics.

The first Polytechnic was founded in Bandung as a cooperation between the Government of Indonesia and Switzerland. Politeknik Mekanik Swiss-ITB or PMS-ITB (Swiss-ITB Mechanical Polytechnic), now Politeknik Manufaktur Bandung or POLMAN Bandung (Bandung Manufacturing Polytechnics), began its academic activities in January 1976 with its Diploma III (Associate Degree) program.

From the successful implementation of educational programs and operationalization of the Swiss-ITB Mechanical Polytechnic, 6 new Polytechnics and a "Polytechnic Education Development Center" in Bandung were developed with credit assistance from the World Bank, through IDA Credit Agreement No. 869-IND dated 29 December 1978 and effective from May 1979, which was known as the Polytechnic Project I.

The success of the project, led the government to begin the Polytechnic Project II with 80/DIKTI/KEP/1985, which called for 11 more general polytechnics and expanded the Polytechnic I Project, through a Loan Agreement with the World Bank No. 2290-IND dated 22 June 1983. A polytechnic at Dili was also built as part of the Polytechnic Project II, but wasn't included in the World Bank Funding due to the status of the Indonesian occupation of Timor Leste. Another polytechnic, Electronic Engineering Polytechnic Institute of Surabaya or PENS was also built in parallel to expansion project of the Polytechnic Project I in cooperation with the Government of Japan

In short: 
 First Polytechnic - POLMAN Bandung
 Polytechnic I Project - 6 Polytechnics
 Polytechnic II Project which were divided into 2 subprojects:
 The Diploma III in Technology - 4 Polytechnics
 The Diploma II in Technology and Commerce - 7 Polytechnics + Dili Polytechnic (Not officially included due to the legal status of East Timor
 Expansion of the 6 Polytechnics constituting the Polytechnic I Project. In parallel with that, a new polytechnic in form of PENS was also constructed
 Agricultural Polytechnic Project - 6 Polytechnics

To the total of 26 operating polytechnics in 1994. All polytechnics, with the exception of the one in Dili, were constructed as part of public universities before being made independent.

Public community colleges

Public Islamic higher education institutions
Public Islamic higher education institutions are under the responsibility of the Ministry of Religious Affairs. There are three types of higher education institutions in this category, State Islamic Universities (UIN), State Islamic Institutes (IAIN), and State Islamic Colleges (STAIN). Currently, there are 58: 23 UIN, 30 IAIN, and 5 STAIN. Acceptance of UIN, IAIN, and STAIN students throughout Indonesia can be done through the National Academic Achievement Selection of State Islamic Higher Education Institutions (SPAN PTKIN), State Islamic Religious College Entrance Exams (UM PTKIN) and the Independent Path regulated by the relevant universities.

Public Islamic universities

Public Islamic institutes

Public Islamic colleges

Private universities
These notable private universities are owned, funded and managed by private organizations, including those affiliated with Islamic (Muhammadiyah), Catholic or Christian socio-religious organizations.

Jakarta

Banten

West Java

Yogyakarta Special Region

Central Java

East Java

North Sumatra

Bengkulu

South Sumatra

Lampung

North Sulawesi

South Sulawesi

Bali

East Nusa Tenggara

West Papua

Other institutions

Institutions of higher education regulated by Indonesia's Ministry of National Education that are authorized to confer degrees, but without the status of universities include:

 Astra Manufacturing Polytechnic (Polman), Jakarta
 Indonesian State College of Accountancy (STAN), Banten
 Institute of Statistics (STIS), Jakarta
 Klabat University, Manado

Image gallery

See also
 Education in Indonesia
 List of Indonesian agricultural universities and colleges
 Union of Catholic University Students of the Republic of Indonesia (PMKRI)

References

External links
 Ministry of National Education of Indonesia
 National Accreditation Board for Higher Education
 Social Indonesia University Listing

Indonesia education-related lists
Indonesia
 
Indonesia

id:Daftar perguruan tinggi di Indonesia
jv:Dhaptar perguruan tinggi ing Indonésia